Khomutovsky District is an administrative and municipal district (raion), one of the twenty-eight in Kursk Oblast, Russia. It is located in the west of the oblast. Its administrative center is the urban locality (a work settlement) of Khomutovka. Population:  16,432 (2002 Census);  The population of Khomutovka accounts for 43.9% of the district's total population.

Geography
Khomutovsky District is located in the west of Kursk Oblast, on the border with Ukraine.  The terrain is hilly plain averaging 200 meters above sea level; the district lies on the Orel-Kursk plateau of the Central Russian Upland.  The main river in the district is the Svapa River.   The district is 80 km northeast of the city of Kursk, and 470 km southwest of Moscow.  The area measures 35 km (north-south), and 40 km (west-east).  The administrative center is the town of Khomutovka.

The district is bordered on the north by Dmitriyevsky District, on the east by Konyshyovsky District, on the south by Rylsky District, and on the west by Bryansk Oblast and a border with Ukraine.

References

Notes

Sources

External links
Khomutovsky District on Google Maps
Khomutovsky District on OpenStreetMap

Districts of Kursk Oblast